Jibla (Kuwaiti , from Qibla ) is a historic area of Kuwait City. It is one of Kuwait's oldest neighbourhoods, although most pre-oil buildings were demolished. The area forms the bulk of the core of modern-day Kuwait City, along with Sharq, Mirgab, and Dasman.

References

External links

Kuwait City